Mount Sinai is a mountain in the Sinai Peninsula of Egypt. 

Mount Sinai may also refer to:
 Mount Sinai (Bible), where, according to the Bible, God gave Moses the Ten Commandments

Places
 Mount Sinai, Indiana, U.S.
 Mount Sinai, New York, U.S.

Other uses
 Mount Sinai Medical Center & Miami Heart Institute, Miami, Florida, U.S.
 Mount Sinai Memorial Park (Toronto), Canada
 Mount Sinai Memorial Park Cemetery, Los Angeles, California U.S.
 Mount Sinai Jewish Center, New York City, New York, U.S.
 Mount Sinai School, Alabama, U.S.
 Mount Sinai School of Medicine, now Icahn School of Medicine at Mount Sinai, New York, U.S.
 Mount Sinai Temple (Sioux City, Iowa), U.S.

See also

 Mount Sinai Cemetery (disambiguation), several cemeteries
 Mount Sinai Hospital (disambiguation), several hospitals
 Temple Sinai (disambiguation)
 Sinai (disambiguation)